Volturara Appula is a town and comune in the province of Foggia in the Apulia region of southeast Italy. Once a flourishing city, the comune now has a population of less than 400.

History 

The date of his foundation is not known; the first historical paper citing it, is a document of Pope Giovanni (John) XIII that, in 969 A.D., lists Volturara as a bishopric, depending from Benevento.  Vulturaria, as it was previously called, was ruled in various times by its bishops, and by a number of noble families, including a branch of Caracciolos that built the so said 'Dukedom Palace'.

Main sights

The Apulian Romanesque cathedral was built in the 13th century. It has a massive bell-tower with three bells of bronze with a noteworthy percentage of silver. Another church, the 16th-century Santuario di Maria SS. della Sanità (Shrine of Our Lady of Health) was reputedly built by Marquis Bartolomeo Caracciolo in thanksgiving for recovery from illness.

Bishopric 

Its bishopric, the Diocese of Vulturara,  was united with that of Diocese of Montecorvino to form the Diocese of Vulturara e Montecorvino in 1433. Giuseppe Cappelletti gives detailed information about most of its bishops. In 1818, upon a reorganization of the dioceses within the Kingdom of the Two Sicilies, the diocese ceased to exist as a residential see and its territory became part of the diocese of Lucera. It is now included in the Catholic Church's list of titular sees.

People
Giuseppe Conte, the Prime Minister of Italy in 2018-2021 was born in Volturara, but grew up in San Giovanni Rotondo.

References

External links 
Pictures of Volturara Appula

Cities and towns in Apulia
Catholic titular sees in Europe